This is a list of singles that have peaked in the top 10 of the German Singles Chart in 2017.

Top 10 singles

* In Top 10 as of 26 May 2017

2016 peaks
 Rag'n'Bone Man - "Human" (Peak: #1, Weeks: 19)
 Bonez MC & RAF Camora (featuring Maxwell) - "Ohne mein Team" (Peak: #7, Weeks: 6)
 The Weeknd (featuring Daft Punk) - "Starboy" (Peak: #3, Weeks: 15)
 David Guetta & Cedric Gervais (featuring Chris Willis) - "Would I Lie to You?" (Peak: #2, Weeks: 11)
 James Arthur - "Say You Won't Let Go" (Peak: #6, Weeks: 10)
 Clean Bandit (featuring Sean Paul & Anne-Marie) - "Rockabye" (Peak: #1, Weeks: 15)
 Mark Forster - "Chöre" (Peak: #2, Weeks: 11)

References

Top 10 singles
Germany Top 10 singles
Germany